Putative pre-mRNA-splicing factor ATP-dependent RNA helicase DHX16 is an enzyme that in humans is encoded by the DHX16 gene.

DEAD box proteins, characterized by the conserved motif Asp-Glu-Ala-Asp (DEAD), are putative RNA helicases. They are implicated in a number of cellular processes involving alteration of RNA secondary structure such as translation initiation, nuclear and mitochondrial splicing, and ribosome and spliceosome assembly. Based on their distribution patterns, some members of this family are believed to be involved in embryogenesis, spermatogenesis, and cellular growth and division. This gene encodes a DEAD box protein, which is a functional homolog of fission yeast Prp8 protein involved in cell cycle progression. This gene is mapped to the MHC region on chromosome 6p21.3, a region where many malignant, genetic and autoimmune disease genes are linked.

References

Further reading